Wild & Bare is a tea and produce retailing company founded in 2008 in Macau, a former Portuguese territory that became a Special Administrative Region of the People's Republic of China. Its founder and chief executive officer, Jean Alberti, is a French chef and restaurateur. Through catalog and online outlets, the company promotes and markets natural, authentic food and drink, including several varieties and blends of Chinese artisan teas, tea accessories, and teaware. Related business interests include a television series still in development.

Products 
Wild & Bare sells natural foods, including heirloom varieties of tea. Several tea growers who sell their teas through Wild & Bare are located in isolated areas of mainland China, such as the Yunnan Province, and the company works with Chinese tea masters to source its products.

Alberti has described the searching out and marketing of authentic teas as characterising his business philosophy. He has stated a commitment to food biodiversity, sustainable agriculture, fair trade, and cultural preservation. The twin concepts of organic farming and fair trade, which are most recently grounded in European movements, have become central to the Wild & Bare business model.

Founder 
Jean Alberti was introduced to food preparation by his restaurant-owning family and his early culinary interest developed into a career as an international chef. The French native is a graduate of Ecole de Hotelier de Murbach in Alsace, France, and in 1976 was named the top apprentice chef in France. After working as a chef de partie in several exclusive restaurants in his native country, Alberti moved to the west coast of the United States and was named executive chef of The Tower Restaurant in Los Angeles. He subsequently became executive chef in then-new Jumby Bay Resort in Antigua, before successfully opening two Mediterranean restaurants in San Francisco, Evvia Estiatorio in 1996 and Kokkari Estiatorio in 1998. In 2002, Alberti was a chef for the James Beard Foundation Awards gala. Alberti opened the Shikumen Bistro, a high-end French brasserie, in Shanghai, China, in 2005. His interest in quality and variety of teas began during his California days when he discovered artisan teas.

References

External links 
 Official Website

Tea companies of China
Chinese companies established in 2008
Food and drink companies of Macau
Retail companies of Macau
Brands of Macau
Tea brands
Food and drink companies established in 2008
2008 establishments in Macau